The Marriage Counselor is a 2008 American stage play created, written, directed and produced by Tyler Perry. It is his tenth play. The show toured from January 2008 to June 2009. It stars Tamar Davis as Dr. Judith Jackson and Tony Grant as Roger Jackson. The live performance released on DVD (January 13, 2009) was recorded live in Cleveland at the State Theatre on May 9 - 11, 2008.

Plot

Shows

Cast
Tamar Davis as Dr. Judith Jackson
Tony Grant as Roger Jackson
Palmer Williams Jr. as Floyd (Stanley) Jackson
Chandra Currelley-Young as T.T. Jackson
Altrinna Grayson** (filmed version)
Myra Beasley as Michelle Smith
Stephanie Ferrett as Becky
Brandi Milton as Patrice Washington
Jermaine Sellers as Oscar Smith 
Donny Sykes (filmed version)
Johnny Gilmore as Reverend Tank Washington
Nicole Jackson as Lisa
Timon Kyle Durrett as Ronald

Band
David Farmer - Musical Director / Keyboards
John "L'Mo" Elmore - Keyboards / Sound Effects
Terrell Sass - Drums / Drum Programming
Phillip Muckle - Bass Guitar
Marius "Moses" Staimez - Guitar
Ryan Kilgore - Saxophone

Musical Numbers

Film adaptation
A film adaptation of the play, Temptation: Confessions of a Marriage Counselor, was filmed in 2012, and released in 2013. The film stars Jurnee Smollett, Lance Gross, Brandy and Kim Kardashian. The film is much darker in tone than the comedic approach of the play.

External links

Plays by Tyler Perry
2008 plays
African-American plays
American plays adapted into films